Scott Carpenter may refer to:
Scott Carpenter (1925–2013), United States astronaut
Scott Carpenter Space Analog Station, a NASA research facility named for the astronaut
Scott Carpenter (murderer) (1975–1997), American criminal executed in 1997
 Scott Carpenter (water polo) (born 1988), British water polo player
 Scott Carpenter (born 1983), an early ring name of Canadian professional wrestler Tyson Smith, now better known as Kenny Omega